Colonel Sir Robert Campbell MacKenzie   (12 January 1856 - 26 May 1945) was a Scottish international rugby union player. He also served in the British Army.

Rugby Union career

Amateur career

He played for Glasgow Academicals.

Provincial career

He played for Glasgow District against Edinburgh District in December 1877.

He played for West of Scotland District against East of Scotland District in February 1878; and in March 1879.

MacKenzie played for the Blues Trial side in February 1878.

International career

Administrative career

He was President of the Scottish Rugby Union for the period 1924 to 1925.

Military career

He was a commander of the Highland Light Infantry.

Outside of rugby and military

He was appointed a Companion of the Order of the Bath in 1911. Following the first World War, he was made a Knight Commander of the Order of the British Empire in the 1919 Birthday Honours.

He died, aged 89, in Duntocher, Dumbartonshire in 1945.

References

1856 births
1945 deaths
Scottish rugby union players
Scotland international rugby union players
Rugby union players from Glasgow
Companions of the Order of the Bath
Knights Commander of the Order of the British Empire
Highland Light Infantry officers
Blues Trial players
Presidents of the Scottish Rugby Union
Glasgow District (rugby union) players
West of Scotland District (rugby union) players
Glasgow Academicals rugby union players
Rugby union centres